Ovídio Manuel Barbosa Pequeno (born 5 November 1954) is a São Toméan diplomat, who served as Minister of Foreign Affairs on two occasions.

He became the Ambassador of São Tomé and Príncipe to the Republic of China (Taiwan) in December 1999, serving in that position until he was appointed Minister of Foreign Affairs on 30 March 2004. He remained Foreign Minister until 16 January 2006, when he resigned.

Following his resignation, he was appointed as Permanent Representative to the United Nations and Ambassador to the United States, Canada and Brazil. He presented his credentials as Ambassador to the US on 10 March 2006, as Permanent Representative to the UN on 27 April 2006, and became Ambassador to Canada on 6 June 2006.

In the government appointed on November 20, 2007, Barbosa Pequeno was again named Minister of Foreign Affairs, replacing Carlos Gustavo dos Anjos.

References

1954 births
Living people
São Tomé and Príncipe diplomats
Permanent Representatives of São Tomé and Príncipe to the United Nations
Foreign Ministers of São Tomé and Príncipe
Ambassadors of São Tomé and Príncipe to Canada
Ambassadors of São Tomé and Príncipe to Taiwan
Ambassadors of São Tomé and Príncipe to Brazil
Ambassadors of São Tomé and Príncipe to the United States
21st-century São Tomé and Príncipe politicians